The Malayalam languages are the
group of Dravidian languages most closely related to Malayalam. In addition to Malayalam itself, they are:
Paniya, Ravula, Beary, Aranadan, Judeo-Malayalam, Arabi Malayalam, Suriyani Malayalam, Kadar, Malapandaram, Malaryan, Malavedan, Mannan, Paliyan, Jeseri, Mullu Kurumba.

Unclassified Malankuravan and Kakkala may be Malayalam languages as well.

Internal classification
Glottolog classifies the Malayalam languages as follows:

References